Willie Jackson (born September 25, 1985), known professionally as Willie The Kid, is an American rapper, songwriter, film producer, entrepreneur and tech investor from Grand Rapids, Michigan, United States.  Willie The Kid made his music debut as a founding member of The Aphilliates working closely with DJ Drama and Don Cannon.  He is the younger brother of Wu-Tang Clan affiliate La the Darkman.

Willie The Kid appeared on both of DJ Drama's Gangsta Grillz: The Album and Gangsta Grillz: The Album (Vol. 2) as well as Lil Wayne's Dedication 2 and Dedication 3 mixtapes.  He released his debut album, Absolute Greatness, in September 2008 on Warner Brothers Records.  He is lauded for his collaborative EP Masterpiece Theatre produced by The Alchemist in 2013.

Outside of his musical career, Willie The Kid is a burgeoning investor and serial entrepreneur. His business portfolio consists of a broadly diverse mix of lifestyle, hospitality, legal cannabis and tech ventures. His businesses include: co-founder of GRUSA, co-founder of Motu Viget Spirits Company, co-owner of Ambiance GR Restaurant and Cocktail Lounge, Motu Lakeshore Wine Bar, Prohibition Bar and Lounge, Sip Coffee and Cocktails, Botanical Company (Boco) Middleville Cannabis Dispensary and Fields - a vertically integrated cannabis hospitality site featuring a grow operation, a processing center, dispensary, restaurant, bar, consumption lounge, event space, farmer's market and a small outdoor amphitheater for live performances alongside business partner Jonathan Jelks. He is also a savvy tech investor with shareholding stakes in The Midwest Tech Project and the innovative geolocation music app Radi8er.

Willie The Kid is the co-executive producer of I, Too, Sing America: Langston Hughes Unfurled, the PBS American Masters documentary produced by Datari Turner and directed by Academy Award winner Kevin Willmott.  He also wrote, co-produced and starred in his own short film The Fly in 2015.

Discography

Studio albums
 2008: Absolute Greatness
 2011: The Fly 2.0
 2011: The Fly 2.0, Japan
 2013: Masterpiece Theatre (with The Alchemist)
 2013: Aquamarine
 2014: The Living Daylights (with Bronze Nazareth)
 2015: The Fly 3
 2017: Deutsche Marks (with V Don)
 2017: Filthy Money (with S-Class Sonny)
 2018: Gold Rush 2 (with Klever Skemes)
 2018: Blue Notes (with V Don)
 2020: Capital Gains
 2020: Deutsche Marks 2 (with V Don)
 2021: Keep Watching The Fly
 2022: Deutsche Marks 3 (with V Don)

EPs
 2010: Never a Dull Moment (with Lee Bannon)
 2012: Dilla Forever
 2013: Somewhere.
 2013: Naledge & Willie the Kid Are...The BrainFly (with BrainFly)
 2018: Watch the Fly 
 2018: Gold Rush (with Klever Skemes)
 2018: Things of That Nature (with Brady James)
 2018: Midwest Willie (with S0op)
 2018: Studio 28 (with Troy Caesar)
 2019: Heather Grey (with V Don)
 2019: City Lights (with Đus)
 2021: Catch Me If You Can (with V Don)

Mixtapes
2006: The Day the Game Changed... (Hosted by DJ Drama, DJ Sense & Don Cannon)
2006: Divide & Conquer (Hosted by DJ Drama & Big Mike)
2009: The Fly (Hosted by DJ Drama & DJ Head Debiase)
2009: The Outkast (Hosted by DJ Scream)
2010: The Cure (Hosted by DJ Woogie)
2011: The Crates
2011: The Cure 2

References

Living people
African-American male rappers
1985 births
Midwest hip hop musicians
Rappers from Michigan
Musicians from Grand Rapids, Michigan
21st-century American rappers
21st-century American male musicians
21st-century African-American musicians
20th-century African-American people